Robert Lawe was Archdeacon of Barnstaple from 1582 to 1585.

References

Archdeacons of Barnstaple

16th-century English clergy